Mohammed Ridha Jalil Mezher Al-Elayawi (born 17 February 2000) is an Iraqi footballer who played as a midfielder for Sanat Naft Abadan F.C. in the Persian Gulf Pro League.

International career
On 27 November 2019, Ridha made his first international cap with Iraq against Qatar in the 24th Arabian Gulf Cup.

Personal life
Ridha is the nephew of Iraqi international footballer Ali Abbas.

Honours
Al-Zawraa
Iraq FA Cup: 2018–19
Iraqi Super Cup: 2021

References

External links

2000 births
Living people
Iraqi footballers
Iraq international footballers
Association football midfielders